Winterthur is a city in the canton of Zürich in northern Switzerland. With over 110,000 residents it is the country's sixth-largest city by population, and is the ninth-largest agglomeration with about 140,000 inhabitants.

The official language of Winterthur is German, but the main spoken language is the local variant of the Alemannic Swiss German dialect, Zürich German. Winterthur is usually abbreviated as Winti in the local dialect and by its inhabitants.

Winterthur is connected to Germany by direct trains and has links to Zurich Airport. It is also a regional transport hub: the A1 motorway from Geneva through to St. Margrethen connects in Winterthur with the A4 motorway heading north toward Schaffhausen and the A7 motorway heading close to the Swiss-German border at Kreuzlingen. There are also roads leading to other places such as Turbenthal. The railway station is the fourth busiest railway station in Switzerland, and is 20 minutes away by train from Zürich.

History
Vitudurum was a vicus in what is now Oberwinterthur during the Roman era (first century BC to third century AD). It was fortified into a castrum at the end of the third century, apparently in reaction to the incipient Alamannic invasion.

There was an Alamannic settlement on the site in the seventh century.

In a battle near Winterthur in 919, Burchard II of Swabia asserted his control over the Thurgau within the Duchy of Swabia against the claims of Rudolph II of Burgundy.

The counts of Winterthur, a cadet branch of the family of the counts of Bregenz, built Kyburg castle in the tenth century. With the extinction of the counts of Winterthur in 1053, the castle passed to the counts of Dillingen. Winterthur as a city (presumably on the site of a pre-existing village) was founded by Hartmann III of Dillingen in 1180, shortly before his death in the same year. From 1180 to 1263, Winterthur was ruled by the cadet line of the House of Kyburg.

When the counts of Kyburg became extinct in the male line in 1263, Winterthur passed to the House of Habsburg, who established a comital line of Neu-Kyburg in 1264 and granted city rights to Winterthur in the same year. From 1415 until 1442 Winterthur was reichsfrei (subject only to the Holy Roman Emperor). However, in the Old Zürich War they lost this freedom and came back under the control of the Austrian Habsburgs. Needing money, in 1467, the Habsburgs sold Winterthur to the city of Zürich.

While it was under the leadership of Zürich, Winterthur's economic freedom was restricted. It lost many of its market rights and the right to trade in some goods. This ended in 1798, when Napoleonic troops took the town. On 27 May 1799, it was the site of the Battle of Winterthur between elements of the French Army of the Danube and elements of the Habsburg army, commanded by Friedrich, Baron von Hotze during the War of the Second Coalition, in the French Revolutionary Wars. Because Winterthur lies near Zürich and at the junction of seven roads, the army that held the town held the access to most of Switzerland and points crossing the Rhine into southern Germany. Although the forces involved were small, the ability of the Austrians to sustain an 11-hour assault against the French line, on the plateau north of Zürich, resulted in the consolidation of three Austrian forces. This led to the French defeat a few days later.

In the 19th century, Winterthur became an industrial town when companies, like Sulzer, Rieter and SLM, built large industrial plants. Winterthur suffered severely from its investments in and guarantee of loans to the National Railway of Switzerland (a private enterprise). In 1878, Winterthur had to sell its shares in the line, and from 1881 to 1885 it was in great difficulties due to a loan of nine million francs guaranteed in 1874 by the town, together with three others in Aargau, to the enterprise. As the three co-guarantor towns were unable to pay their shares, the whole burden fell on Winterthur, which struggled to meet its liabilities. But it was assisted by large loans from the cantonal and federal governments.

The Great Depression, in the 1930s, hit Winterthur extremely hard. Sixty percent of the total employees in town worked in the machine industry. Jobs became extremely hard to find. However, with the outbreak of World War II, industry grew again in the city.

In 2008, Winterthur reached 100,000 inhabitants.

Geography

Topography

The city is located in a basin south and east of the river Töss before it meets the High Rhine after 10 kilometers. The Eulach, a small river, flows from the town's east end through the middle of the town to meet the Töss at the west exit of the city. Because of this the town is colloquially also called "Eulachstadt".

Area 
Of the total unproductive area, water (streams and lakes) made up 0.6% of the area. , 27.6% of the total municipal area was undergoing some type of construction.

Politics

Subdivisions
Winterthur has seven city districts:
1 – Winterthur-Stadt, 2 – Oberwinterthur, 3 – Seen, 4 – Töss, 5 – Veltheim, 6 – Wülflingen, 7 – Mattenbach

Government
The City Council (Stadtrat) constitutes the executive government of the City of Winterthur and operates as a collegiate authority. It is composed of seven councilors, each presiding over a department. Departmental tasks, coordination measures and implementation of laws decreed by the Large Municipal Council are carried by the City Council. In the mandate period 2018–2022 (Legislatur) the City Council is presided by Stadtpräsident Michael Künzle. The regular election of the City Council by any inhabitant valid to vote is held every four years. Any resident of Winterthur allowed to vote can be elected as a member of the City Council. The mayor is elected as such by public election by means of a system of Majorz, while the heads of the other directorates are assigned by the collegiate. The delegates are elected by means of a system of Majorz.

, Winterthur's City Council is made up of three representatives of the SP (Social Democratic Party), one member of the FDP (FDP.The Liberals), one of the GPS (Green Party), one of the GLP (Green Liberal Party), and one of the CVP (Christian Democratic People's Party, who is also the mayor), giving the left parties a combined four out of seven seats. The last regular election was held on 5 March and 15 April 2018, the last special election on 23 August 2020.

Ansgar Simon is Town Chancellor (Stadtschreiber) since and Marcel Wendelspiess is Legal Counsel (Rechtskonsulent) since 2013 for the City Council.

Parliament

The Large Municipal Council (Grosser Gemeinderat) holds legislative power. It is made up of 60 members, with elections held every four years. The Large Municipal Council decrees regulations and by-laws that are executed by the City Council and the administration. The delegates are selected by means of a system of proportional representation (Proporz).

The sessions of the Large Municipal Council are public. Unlike members of the City Council, members of the Large Municipal Council are not politicians by profession, and they are paid a fee based on their attendance. Any resident of Winterthur allowed to vote can be elected as a member of the Large Municipal Council. The parliament holds its meetings in the Rathaus once a month on Mondays.

The last regular election of the Large Municipal Council was held on 8 March 2018 for the mandate period from May 2018 to April 2022. Currently the Large Municipal Council consists of 18 members of the Social Democratic Party (SP/PS), 10 Swiss People's Party (SVP/UDC), 8 The Liberals (FDP/PLR), 7 Green Liberal Party (GLP/PVL), 5 Green Party (GPS/PES), 4 Evangelical People's Party (EVP), 3 Christian Democratic People's Party (CVP/PDC), 2 Alternative List (AL), one representative each of the Conservative Democratic Party (BDP/PBD), Federal Democratic Union (EDU/UDF), and the Pirate Party.

National Elections

National Council
In the 2019 federal election for the Swiss National Council the most popular party was the PS which received 22.6% (−3.4) of the vote. The next six most popular parties were the SVP (17.8%, -5.6), the Green Party (17.8%, +9), the glp (14.3%, +5.5), FDP (10.6%, -1.5), the EVP (5.0%, 0), and the CVP (4.2%, +0.2). In the federal election a total of 32,907 votes were cast, and the voter turnout was 47.0%.

In the 2015 election for the Swiss National Council the most popular party was the SPS which received 26.1% of the vote. The next most popular parties were the SVP (23.4%), the FDP (12.1%), the Green Party (8.8%), the glp (8.8%), the EVP (5.0%), the CVP (4.0%), and BDP (3.5%). In the federal election, a total of 33,426 voters were cast, and the voter turnout was 49.3%.
In the 2011, federal election the most popular party was the SP which received 22.5% of the vote. The next three most popular parties were the SVP (21.8%), the Green Liberals (11.1%) and the Green Party (10.1%).

International relations

Twin towns 
Winterthur is twinned with two Swiss and two international towns and coordinates its international relations together with the Swiss towns Frauenfeld, St. Gallen, and Schaffhausen:
  Yverdon-les-Bains, Switzerland
  La Chaux-de-Fonds, Switzerland
  Pilsen, Czech Republic
  Hall in Tirol, Austria

Namesake
The community of Winterthur in Delaware, USA, is named after the city.

Demographics

 the population of Winterthur is 100,000. Over the last 10 years the population has grown at a rate of 10.4%. Most of the population speaks German (83.0%), with Italian being second-most common (4.9%) and Albanian being third (2.0%).

The age distribution of the population is children and teenagers (0–19 years old) make up 19.9% of the population, while adults (20–64 years old) make up 63.9% and seniors (over 64 years old) make up 16.2%. There are 42,028 households in Winterthur.

 there were 37,327 members of the Swiss Reformed Church (37.1% of the population) and 26,995 Catholics (26.7% of the population) in Winterthur. Of the other Christian faiths, 326 (0.3%) were Lutheran, 203 (0.2%) were Christian Catholic, 3141 (3.1%) are some type of Christian Orthodox and 3,132 (3.1%) are another Christian faith. Of the rest of the population, 11,608 (11.5%) were Muslim, 108 (0.1%) were Jewish, 1,359 (1.3%) belonged to another non-Christian faith and 16,779 (16.6%) were atheist or agnostic or did not belong to any organized faith.

Economy

Historically, Winterthur was one of the homes of Switzerland's rail industry and an industrial centre, however the rail industry and other heavy industry have mostly shut down. Amongst the most significant companies was Sulzer Brothers, today's Sulzer Ltd., Sulzer AG, commonly abbreviated to Sulzer. Textile production declined even earlier on. The Rieter textile machinery company is based in Winterthur.

Switzerland's largest bank, and one of the world's large banks, Union Bank of Switzerland (UBS, since 1998 UBS AG), was founded in Winterthur.

The Landbote newspaper is situated in Winterthur, and also serves as Winterthurer Stadtanzeiger, the official publication organ of the city of Winterthur.

Peraves, the manufacturer of the fully enclosed "cabin motorcycle" named the Monotracer, predated by an earlier model named the Ecomobile, has been manufacturing these vehicles since the early 1980s. In 2010, Peraves won the Progressive Insurance Automotive X-Prize with an electric powered version of the Monotracer.

Among other commercial organizations, Winterthur was home to Switzerland's largest insurance business Winterthur Insurance. Until its acquisition, the company was the largest in Switzerland and was in Europe's top 10. On 1 January 2007 the Winterthur company was acquired by the French AXA group and is now known as AXA Winterthur.

, Winterthur had an unemployment rate of 3.53%. , there were 185 people employed in the primary economic sector and about 60 businesses involved in this sector; 11,880 people are employed in the secondary sector and there are 884 businesses in this sector; 59,767 people are employed in the tertiary sector, with 6,983 businesses in this sector.  47.9% of the working population were employed full-time, and 52.1% were employed part-time.

Education
In Winterthur, about 70.7% of the population (between ages 25 and 64) have completed either non-mandatory upper secondary education or additional higher education (either university or a Fachhochschule).

The town is renowned for its institute of higher education Technikum, which is the largest school of technology in Switzerland. The institute has recently teamed up with schools from Zürich and is now known as Zürcher Hochschule für Angewandte Wissenschaften (ZHAW).

The headquarters of the Club of Rome are located in Winterthur.

SIS Swiss International School maintains a campus in Winterthur. International School Winterthur, formerly located in Winterthur, closed in 2015.

Transport

Bahnhof Winterthur, the central station, is one of the busiest stations on the Swiss Railway Network with 105,000 passengers a day. As the town is close to Zürich, it is served by many trains on the local Zürich S-Bahn network. EuroCity services to Munich and regional trains to St. Gallen, Konstanz or Romanshorn also serve the station. As well as the Hauptbahnhof, there are nine more stations within the city, called Oberwinterthur, Seen, Grüze, Töss, Hegi, Reutlingen, Wülflingen, Wallrüti and Sennhof-Kyburg.

The local public transport is run by STADTBUS Winterthur with twelve town bus lines, including the Winterthur trolleybus system, and five regional bus lines.

There are two airports: Winterthur Hegmatten (LSPH) and Speck (LSZK).

Tourism
Winterthur is not high on the list of tourist destinations in Switzerland. As a result, it does not offer a wide range of hotels to choose from. As it is relatively easy to reach from Zürich by public transport, tourists who do visit Winterthur often stay in Zürich.

Nevertheless, Winterthur is mentioned in most tourist guides for its numerous museums, many of which offer world class art, among them of the Gottfried Keller-Stiftung. The most famous are:

 Oskar Reinhart Collection 'Am Römerholz'
 Oskar Reinhart Collection am Stadtgarten
 Kunstmuseum Winterthur
 Villa Flora (closed in 2016)
 Fotomuseum Winterthur
 Swiss Science Center Technorama

Culture

Music 
Winterthur's chamber orchestra Orchester Musikkollegium Winterthur is the oldest orchestra in Switzerland, and also plays at the Zurich Opera. Between 1922 and 1950, the philanthropist Werner Reinhart and the conductor Hermann Scherchen played a leading role in shaping the musical life of Winterthur, with numerous premiere performances emphasizing contemporary music.

The city hall Stadthaus, in which the concerts of the Musikkollegium take place, was built by Gottfried Semper.

Musikfestwochen, in late August and early September, sees Winterthur's Old Town taken over for live music of all kinds, in the street and bars as well as in concert venues.

The "Albanifest", the largest annual festival in a historic town in Switzerland, is named after Saint Alban, one of the city's four saints, is held here, over three days in late June every year. Although a recent creation, the festival celebrates the granting of a charter to the town in 1264 by Rudolf of Habsburg on 22 June of that year, which happened to be the saint's day.

The church of St. Laurenz in the city centre dates from 1264, the town hall was built in 1781, the assembly hall in 1865.

In 1989, Winterthur received the Wakker Prize for the development and preservation of its architectural heritage.

The Swiss folk metal band Eluveitie was formed in Winterthur and the Punkabilly band The Peacocks comes from here.

Arts

Open Doors 
Open Doors is an artist supported platform for artists with art studios in Winterthur, Switzerland. The platform was established to bridge arts and the community as well as provide the artists with means to independently promote their art in any way they choose. Open Doors takes place annually during the last weekend of September. Participating artists open their studios to the public and present their art to the public. Oftentimes it is possible to view the artists while they are working. Among the approximate 60 artists who participate there are local, international, autodidacts and art academy graduates. Open Doors Winterthur was founded in 2008 by San Francisco-born artist Michelle Bird and resident of Winterthur. Open Doors Winterthur publishes the annual MAP Magazine Artist Professionals which is available on line and in print form. MAP Magazine features articles about local art initiatives and profiles local artists and their art studios. The event is supported by a map that indicates the location of each artist's studio on a map.

Sport
EHC Winterthur is the city's main hockey team which currently plays in the Swiss League, the second-highest ice hockey league in Switzerland. Their arena is the 3,000-seat Deutweg Arena. The arena held in April 2011 the 2011 IIHF Women's World Championship top division, sharing the hosting with the Hallenstadion in Zürich.

FC Winterthur are the city's football club and currently play in the Swiss Super League. They play at the Stadion Schützenwiese.

Pfadi Winterthur is the professional handball club, former multiple national champions and still playing in the Swiss First League of Handball. They play at the Winterthur Central Sports Hall which they share with top floorball club HC Rychenberg Winterthur.

Winterthur Lions AFC, founded in 2017, have been playing Australian rules football in the AFL Switzerland league since 2019.

Notable people

1800–1850 

 Jonas Furrer (1805–1861), politician, first Federal President of Switzerland
 David Eduard Steiner (1811–1860), painter, eraser and lithographer
 Henrik Haggenmacher (1827–1917), Swiss-born Hungarian industrialist, business magnate, philanthropist and investor
 Konrad Grob (1828–1904), lithographer and painter
 Jacob Weidenmann (1829–1893), landscape architect

1851–1900 

 Charles E. L. Brown (1863–1924), machine designer, co-founder (Brown, Boveri & Cie)
 Heinrich Wölfflin (1864–1945), art historian
 John Henry Hintermeister (1869–1945), Zurich educated painter, commercially successful in the United States
 Alfred Ernst (1875–1968), botanist
 Hans Gamper (1877–1930), sportsman and founder of FC Barcelona
 Joan Gamper (1877–1930), Swiss football pioneer, versatile athlete and club president.
 Ernst Wetter (1877–1963), politician 
 Alfred Büchi (1879–1959), inventor of the exhaust gas turbocharger
 Albert Thellung (1881–1928), botanist
 Werner Reinhart (1884–1951), industrialist and patron
 Oskar Reinhart (1885–1965), art collectors and patrons
 Emil Brunner (1889–1966), a reformed theologian
 Jakob Flach (1894–1982), writer, puppeteer and painter
 Willy Bretscher (1897–1992), newspaper writer and editor

1901–1950 

 Georges Miez (1904–1999), gymnast 
 Willy Hess (composer) (1906–1997), musicologist and composer
 Albert Büchi (1907–1988), cyclist
 Max Bill (1908–1994), architect, artist and designer
 Warja Lavater (1913–2007), graphic artist and illustrator
 Sigmund Widmer (1919–2003), Swiss politician, historian and writer, University of Zürich faculty
 Rudolf Friedrich (1923–2013), lawyer and politician
 Georg Gerster (born 1928), journalist, pioneer of flight photography
 Bruno Hunziker (1930–2000), politician, parliamentarian and economic attorney
 Richard R. Ernst (1933–2021), chemist (Nobel Prize Laureate 1991)
 Ursula Bagdasarjanz (born 1934), violinist
 Hannes Keller (born 1934), computer pioneer, entrepreneur, diving pioneer and amateur pianist
 Niklaus Wirth (born 1934), computer scientist
 Oscar Fritschi (1939–2016), politician
 Michael Gempart (born 1941), actor
 Markus Imhoof (born 1941), film director and screenwriter
 Hans-Ulrich Brunner (1943–2006), painter
 Beat Raaflaub (born 1946), conductor
 Jürg Amann (1947–2013), writer

1951–2000 
 Viktor Giacobbo (born 1952), Swiss writer, comedian and actor
 Mirco Müller (born 1995), Swiss ice hockey player, currently playing for the New Jersey Devils
 Martin Buser (born 1958), Swiss dog musher, 4-time Iditarod champion
 Marlies Bänziger (born 1960), Swiss politician
 Chantal Galladé (born 1972), Swiss politician
 Chrigel Glanzmann (born 1975), Swiss musician, founder of Eluveitie
 Steven Zuber (born 1991), Swiss professional football player

Notes and references

Notes

References

External links

 Official Webpage of Winterthur
 Official Webpage Economic Development Region of Winterthur
 Tourismusbüro Winterthur
 Musikkollegium Winterthur
 Homepage of Winterthur's city Orchestra
 Official Webpage Open Doors 

 
Cities in Switzerland
Municipalities of the canton of Zürich
Winterthur (1415-1442)